Lukáš Fialka (born 19 September 1995) is a former professional Czech footballer.

Club career

MFK Skalica
He made his professional Fortuna Liga debut for Skalica against Spartak Myjava on 12 September 2015.

External links
 MFK Skalica official club profile
 Fortuna Liga profile
 
 Futbalnet profile
 Eurofotbal profile

1995 births
Footballers from Prague
Living people
Czech footballers
Association football defenders
SK Slavia Prague players
MFK Skalica players
FK Dobrovice players
Czech First League players
Slovak Super Liga players
Bohemian Football League players
Czech expatriate footballers
Czech expatriate sportspeople in Slovakia
Expatriate footballers in Slovakia